Stenolis is a genus of beetles in the family Cerambycidae, containing the following species:

 Stenolis angulata (Fabricius, 1801)
 Stenolis calligramma (Bates, 1872)
 Stenolis flavoguttata Monne, 2011
 Stenolis giesberti Monne, 2011
 Stenolis gilvolineata Monne, 2011
 Stenolis inclusa (Bates, 1885)
 Stenolis laetifica (Bates, 1872)
 Stenolis marcelae Monne, 2011
 Stenolis multimacula Monne, 2011
 Stenolis nearnsi Monne, 2011
 Stenolis polygramma (Bates, 1872)
 Stenolis polytaenia (Bates, 1885)
 Stenolis pulverea (Bates, 1881)
 Stenolis tavakiliani Monne, 2011
 Stenolis theobromae (Lara & Shenefelt, 1964)
 Stenolis vigintiguttata (Bates, 1885)
 Stenolis xanthostigma Monne, 2011

References

 
Acanthocinini